Winkel projection is a group of three projections proposed by German cartographer Oswald Winkel (7 January 1874 – 18 July 1953) in 1921. Winkel projections use arithmetic mean of the equirectangular projection and other projections. Winkel I projection uses sinusoidal projection. Winkel II projection uses Mollweide projection. Winkel Tripel (Winkel III) projection uses Aitoff projection. Winkel I and II projections are pseudocylindrical projections. 

Winkel tripel projection is the most famous projection in these three projections.

See also

 List of map projections

References

Map projections